Aloys Felke (20 February 1927, in Laufersweiler – 13 January 1997, in Sohren) was a German politician and furniture manufacturer.

Life
In 1956 Aloys Felke started working with his two brothers Walter and Günter Felke as a business graduate in the manufacture of furniture, a firm founded by his father Michael Felke.

From 1969 to 1971 he was a representative of the Landtag of Rhineland-Palatinate for the CDU-Party.

Aloys Felke was married and father of two children.

Distinctions
 1984: Ehrennadel des Landes Rheinland-Pfalz 
 1995: Medal of Merit

References

1927 births
1997 deaths
People from Rhein-Hunsrück-Kreis
People from the Rhine Province
Christian Democratic Union of Germany politicians
Recipients of the Medal of the Order of Merit of the Federal Republic of Germany